Daniel Patrick Manabat Caluag (born 15 January 1987 in Harbor City, California, United States) is a Filipino American BMX racer who competed for the Philippines in the BMX event of the 2012 Summer Olympics. Caluag was eliminated after the qualifying heats. He won the men's elite gold medal in the 2013 Asian BMX Cycling Championships in Singapore

On October 1, 2014, the Filipino Olympian has set another milestone by winning the Philippines' first and only gold medal in BMX Cycling at the 17th Asian Games 2014 in Incheon, South Korea.

Caluag was named 2014 Athlete of the Year trophy at the Philippine Sportswriters Association Awards Night. Caluag was also part of the 14 scholar-athletes who have scholarships from the Olympic Solidarity Movement under the Philippine Olympic Committee.

Early life
Caluag was born to Daniel Ramos Caluag and Isabelita Manabat Caluag. Both of Caluag's parents were involved in the field of medicine, with Daniel Ramos being a respiratory therapist from Malolos, Bulacan and Isabelita being a registered nurse from Licab, Nueva Ecija. Both of his parents migrated separately and met in California with Daniel Ramos first migrating to Guam at a young age before migrating to the US mainland. Caluag and his only sibling and brother, Christopher was born in the United States.

Personal life
Daniel Caluag resides in Lexington in the US state of Kentucky with his Stephanie with whom he has a baby daughter named Sydney. His brother, Christopher lives in California and bikes with Daniel whenever he later visits. Daniel Caluag and his wife earned their nursing degrees at the Lindsey Wilson College in Lexington last May 2014. As of March 2015, Caluag and his wife works at the UK HealthCare in Lexington. Caluag works at the medical/surgical oncology and bone transplant unit at the Markey Cancer Center of UK HealthCare.

References

External links
 
 
 

1987 births
Living people
BMX riders
Cyclists at the 2012 Summer Olympics
Filipino male cyclists
American male cyclists
American sportspeople of Filipino descent
Olympic cyclists of the Philippines
Cyclists from Los Angeles
Asian Games medalists in cycling
Cyclists at the 2014 Asian Games
Cyclists at the 2018 Asian Games
Filipino nurses
Asian Games gold medalists for the Philippines
Asian Games bronze medalists for the Philippines
Lindsey Wilson College alumni
Medalists at the 2014 Asian Games
Medalists at the 2018 Asian Games
People from Harbor City, Los Angeles
Southeast Asian Games medalists in cycling
Southeast Asian Games gold medalists for the Philippines
Southeast Asian Games competitors for the Philippines
Southeast Asian Games bronze medalists for the Philippines
Competitors at the 2013 Southeast Asian Games
Competitors at the 2019 Southeast Asian Games
Southeast Asian Games silver medalists for the Philippines